Sayeh Sangan (also Romanized as Sāyeh Sangān, Seyāh Sangān and Sīāh Sangān; also known as Seh Sangu) is a village in Arabkhaneh Rural District, Shusef District, Nehbandan County, South Khorasan Province, Iran. At the 2006 census, its population was 22, in 7 families.

References 

Populated places in Nehbandan County